This is a list of members of the eighth parliament of the South Australian House of Assembly, which sat from 6 May 1875 until 13 March 1878. The members were elected at the 1875 election.

 Light MHA Randolph Isham Stow resigned on 6 May 1875. Jenkin Coles won the resulting by-election on 17 May.
 The two members for Yatala, Wentworth Cavenagh and Lavington Glyde, both resigned on 6 May 1875. Both men recontested the resulting by-election, which saw Cavenagh returned but Glyde defeated by Thomas Cowan.
 Matthew Madge was initially declared elected as a member for Wallaroo, but his election was challenged and he was unseated on 20 May 1875. Robert Dalrymple Ross won the resulting by-election on 4 June.
 Johann Sudholz was initially declared elected as a member for Barossa, but his election was challenged and he was unseated on 22 May 1875. John Dunn Jr. won the resulting by-election on 9 June.
 Albert MHA Mountifort Conner resigned on 6 May 1875. William Wigley won the resulting by-election on 17 May.
 Wooroora MHA James Pearce resigned on 27 July 1875. John Bosworth won the resulting by-election on 7 August.
 Sturt MHA Samuel Way resigned on 20 March 1876 to take up the position of Chief Justice of the Supreme Court of South Australia. Thomas King won the resulting by-election on 10 April.
 Mount Barker MHA William West-Erskine resigned on 21 April 1876. James G. Ramsay won the resulting by-election on 1 May.
 Barossa MHA John Howard Angas resigned on 10 May 1875. M. P. F. Basedow won the resulting by-election on 20 May.
 West Adelaide MHA William Knox Simms resigned on 13 June 1876. John Darling Sr. won the resulting by-election on 21 June.
 West Torrens MHA Benjamin Taylor resigned on 19 September 1876. John Sinclair won the resulting by-election on 27 September.
 North Adelaide MHA Arthur Blyth accepted the office of South Australia's Agent General in London on 21 February 1877. His brother, Neville Blyth, won the resulting by-election on 14 March.
 East Torrens MHA Edwin Thomas Smith resigned on 1 March 1877. David Murray won the resulting by-election on 27 March.
 Victoria MHA John Ingleby resigned on 11 April 1877. Lavington Glyde won the resulting by-election on 17 May.

References

17. Victoria
21. Wooroora

Members of South Australian parliaments by term
19th-century Australian politicians